James Oakes (born December 19, 1953) is an American historian, and is a Distinguished Professor of History and Graduate School Humanities Professor at the Graduate Center of the City University of New York where he teaches history courses on the American Civil War and Reconstruction, Slavery, the Old South, Abolitionism and U.S. and World History. He taught previously at Princeton University and Northwestern University.

Career
Oakes' book The Radical and the Republican: Frederick Douglass, Abraham Lincoln, and the Triumph of Antislavery Politics (2007) was a co-winner of the 2008 Lincoln Prize. The prize jury highlighted the book's use of a new comparative framework for understanding the careers of Lincoln and Douglass, and their respective views of race. It also noted that Oakes had succeeded in writing a scholarly work that was accessible to the general public.

His more recent work focuses on emancipation and how it was implemented throughout the Southern states. In 2013 Oakes published Freedom National: The Destruction of Slavery in the United States, 1861-1865, which garnered him a second Lincoln Prize (2013). David Brion Davis, writing in The New York Review of Books, identified the basic theme of Freedom National as the view that Lincoln's Republican Party had been an antislavery party both before and during the war, one that viewed defining humans as chattel as both a violation of the "freedom principle" embodied in natural and international law and a violation of the US Constitution, which defined slaves as "persons held in service". In Freedom National (p. xxiii), Oakes wrote, "Like most historians I always believed that the purpose of the war shifted 'from Union to emancipation.'" But, in fact, although "Republicans did not believe that the Constitution allowed them to wage a war for any 'purpose' other than the restoration of the Union, ... from the very beginning they insisted that slavery was the cause of the rebellion and emancipation an appropriate and ultimately indispensable means of suppressing it." Eric Foner called the work "the best account ever written of the complex historical process known as emancipation". Oakes also wrote the foreword to Randy Barnett and Evan Bernick's The Original Meaning of the 14th Amendment: Its Letter and Spirit (The Belknap Press of Harvard University Press, 2021).

Works
 The Ruling Race: A History of American Slaveholders, Knopf, 1982. 
 "Slavery as an American Problem", in 
 
  Review
  Review
 The Scorpion's Sting: Antislavery and the Coming of the Civil War, W. W. Norton & Company, 2014. 
 "When Everybody Knew", in Blight, David W.; Downs, Jim, eds. (2017). Beyond Freedom: Disrupting the History of Emancipation. The University of Georgia Press. pp. 104-117. 
 The Crooked Path to Abolition: Abraham Lincoln and the Antislavery Constitution, W. W. Norton & Company, 2021.

References

External links
Tavis Smiley interview with James Oakes. April 6, 2007. pbs.org. Archived from the original on January 27, 2011
Tom Mackaman interview with James Oakes on World Socialist Web Site, about The New York Times' 1619 Project, 18 November 2019. 

Living people
City University of New York faculty
Graduate Center, CUNY faculty
Baruch College alumni
UC Berkeley College of Engineering alumni
Lincoln Prize winners
1953 births
Historians of Abraham Lincoln
People from the Bronx
Historians from New York (state)